Lee Seon-seong (born 26 December 1980) is a South Korean gymnast. He competed at the 2004 Summer Olympics.

References

External links
 

1980 births
Living people
South Korean male artistic gymnasts
Olympic gymnasts of South Korea
Gymnasts at the 2004 Summer Olympics
Place of birth missing (living people)
Asian Games medalists in gymnastics
Gymnasts at the 2002 Asian Games
Asian Games silver medalists for South Korea
Medalists at the 2002 Asian Games
21st-century South Korean people